Musa bauensis is a species of wild banana (genus Musa), native to Sarawak, Malaysia. It is placed in section Callimusa (now including the former section Australimusa), having a diploid chromosome number of 2n = 20.

References

bauensis
Endemic flora of Borneo
Flora of Sarawak
Plants described in 2004